The 1986–87 NCAA Division I men's ice hockey season began in October 1986 and concluded with the 1987 NCAA Division I Men's Ice Hockey Tournament's championship game on March 28, 1987 at the Joe Louis Arena in Detroit, Michigan. This was the 40th season in which an NCAA ice hockey championship was held and is the 93rd year overall where an NCAA school fielded a team.

Notre Dame and Kent State formed the ACHA with two other schools, however, the two other universities didn't play at the Division I level and its standings are not official.

Regular season

Season tournaments

Standings

1987 NCAA Tournament

Note: * denotes overtime period(s)

Player stats

Scoring leaders
The following players led the league in points at the conclusion of the season.

  
GP = Games played; G = Goals; A = Assists; Pts = Points; PIM = Penalty minutes

Leading goaltenders
The following goaltenders led the league in goals against average at the end of the regular season while playing at least 33% of their team's total minutes.

GP = Games played; Min = Minutes played; W = Wins; L = Losses; OT = Overtime/shootout losses; GA = Goals against; SO = Shutouts; SV% = Save percentage; GAA = Goals against average

Awards

NCAA

CCHA

ECAC

Hockey East

WCHA

See also
 1986–87 NCAA Division III men's ice hockey season

References

External links
College Hockey Historical Archives
1986–87 NCAA Standings

 
NCAA